Mass No. 1 may refer to:

 Mass No. 1 (Bruckner), in D minor, by Anton Bruckner
 Mass No. 1 (Mozart), in G minor, by Wolfgang Amadeus Mozart
 Mass No. 1 (Schubert), in F major, by Franz Schubert